Jakob Koppas (1902 – 27 July 1937 Saksi Parish (now Tapa Parish), Kreis Wierland) was an Estonian politician. He was a member of the V Riigikogu.

References

1902 births
1937 deaths
People from Tapa Parish
People from Kreis Wierland
Settlers' Party politicians
Members of the Riigikogu, 1932–1934